Francisco Puertas Soto (born 18 September 1963) is a Spanish rugby union footballer. He played at fullback or flyhalf.

He was capped 93 times by Spain, from 1994 to 2001. Soto played for his country at the 1999 Rugby World Cup finals.

He was the most capped Spanish international rugby union player, ending his career after the 1999 Rugby World Cup. He coached Spain national rugby sevens team, Ordizia, Zarautz and Atlético San Sebastian.

Notes

1963 births
Living people
Rugby union fly-halves
Rugby union fullbacks
Spanish rugby union coaches
Spanish rugby union players
Rugby union players from the Basque Country (autonomous community)
Spain international rugby union players
People from Goierri
Sportspeople from Gipuzkoa